Pleasure Train (Italian: Treno di piacere) is a 1924 Italian silent film directed by Luciano Doria and starring Oreste Bilancia and Pauline Polaire. The film was shot by the Turin-based Fert Film company. It still exists in archives.

Cast
 Augusto Bandini
 Alex Bernard
 Oreste Bilancia
 Alberto Collo
 Petronilla Garis
 Alberto Pasquali
 Pauline Polaire
 Armand Pouget
 Lidia Quaranta
 Franz Sala
 Elena Sangro
 Domenico Serra

References

Bibliography 
 Jacqueline Reich. The Maciste Films of Italian Silent Cinema. Indiana University Press, 2015.

External links 
 

1924 films
Italian silent feature films
1920s Italian-language films

Italian black-and-white films